The 1983 Rhein-Main Starfighter crash happened on 22 May 1983, in connection with an air show at the Rhein-Main Air Base. A Canadian Armed Forces Canadair CF-104 Starfighter crashed on a nearby highway, killing six.

Background 

Pentecost is an extended holiday weekend in Germany in a row of three holiday weekends, with a lot of festival activities taking place. On 22 May 1983 in Frankfurt, the traditional "Wäldchestag" (forest day, albeit written in local dialect) drew people from the city into a forest area where a mobile fun park was erected. The tennis club near the soccer stadium Waldstadion held a tennis tournament and the Rhein-Main Air Base held a public open day air show. Part of the presentation was a display of formation aerobatics by Canadian Armed Forces Canadair CF-104 Starfighters (CF-104) from CFB Baden–Soellingen (Baden).

Crash 

Five CF-104s from 439 (Sabre-Toothed Tiger) Squadron CAF (439 Sqn) performed formation aerobatics. One of the aircraft left the formation, flew several kilometers North-East and crashed near the Waldstadion onto federal road 44.

The pilot was able to eject safely, but burning pieces of the airplane hit the car of Pastor Jürges and his family, who were on their way to the Odenwald mountains for a day-trip. The family, Pastor Martin Jürges (40), his wife Irmtraud (38), his mother Erna (77) and his children Jan (11) and Katharina (11 months) died at the scene of the accident. Jürges’ 19-year old niece Gesine Wagner managed to escape from the car, but was caught by the fireball of the exploding jet and burned extensively, dying on 11 August 1983, 81 days after the accident.

Investigation 

Due to the NATO status of forces agreement the accident was investigated by the Canadian Department of National Defence. The state prosecutor in Frankfurt started, according to the rules, a cause of death investigation, but its investigation solely relied on the results of the Canadian investigation. Officially the results were only passed to the German state prosecutor as a press release, stating briefly that "neither technical failure nor human error" can be exempt as the cause of the accident. An investigation by the Hessischer Rundfunk in 2003 showed that although the leading state prosecutor had authority to question the pilot, he acceded to the Canadian accident report.

Aftermath 

It was soon realized that the crash could have caused many more fatal casualties, as the ongoing tennis tournament as well as the fun fair in the forest was just a few hundred meters from the crash site. As a result, the German defense ministry prohibited at first in general air shows in metropolitan areas which was later changed to prohibit air shows with jet airplanes in metropolitan areas.

During the 81 days in hospital Gesine dictated letters to her family and friends, which her parents published as a book.

In 2003, hr-fernsehen broadcast a documentary about the accident. According to the documentary, the owners of damaged cars were compensated fairly quickly after the accident. The parents of Gesine Wagner did not receive any support from officials while Gesine was in hospital or any condolences or compensation after her death.

A square in the Frankfurt district of Gutleutviertel – where Martin Jürges was pastor – is named after the Jürges family. A plaque commemorates the accident on May 22, 1983.

See also 

 1955 Altensteig mid-air collision
 1960 Munich C-131 crash
 1964 Machida F-8 crash
 1988 Remscheid A-10 crash
 Cavalese cable car disaster (1998)

References

External links 
 HR Online web special, 2008
 Family Jürges remembrance page
 Eject of the pilot listed on May 22nd, 1983
 Amateur film footage of the crash

Aviation accidents and incidents in 1983
Aviation accidents and incidents in Germany
1983 in West Germany
Accidents and incidents involving military aircraft
Aviation accidents and incidents at air shows
May 1983 events in Europe
1980s in Hesse
Canada–Germany relations